René Exbrayat (born 30 October 1947) is French former footballer and football manager.

He played for Arles and Aix-en-Provence, playing for France amateur football team at the Mediterranean Games.

He coached Arles, Beaucaire, Avignon, Bastia, Nîmes, Martigues, Le Havre, Club Africain, Servette and Al-Nasr Dubai.

He was also an assistant coach at Rennes.

References

External links

1947 births
Living people
French footballers
French football managers
AC Arlésien players
Ligue 2 players
AC Arlésien managers
SC Bastia managers
Nîmes Olympique managers
FC Martigues managers
Le Havre AC managers
Servette FC managers
Ligue 1 managers
Club Africain football managers
Al-Nasr SC (Dubai) managers
Association football forwards
Pays d'Aix FC players
AC Avigonnnais managers
People from Arles
Sportspeople from Bouches-du-Rhône
Footballers from Provence-Alpes-Côte d'Azur